The Epiphone Les Paul is a solid body guitar line produced by Epiphone as a more modestly priced version of the famous Gibson Les Paul. Epiphone is a subsidiary of Gibson Guitar Corporation and manufactures the Les Paul model and other budget models at a lower cost in Asia.

Les Paul Standard
Very similar to a Gibson Les Paul standard, it has a solid mahogany  body, mahogany neck (most models) with a rosewood fingerboard, Alnico Classic Humbuckers, Grover tuning pegs,  and a Tune-o-Matic bridge. It is considered by some as the flagship model of Les Paul manufactured by Epiphone.
There is a "Plain-Top" model that features a smooth maple top and a "Plus-Top" model that features a flame maple top.

Les Paul Standard PlusTop and Quilt Top PRO
The Les Paul Standard PlusTop PRO is a version of the Epiphone Les Paul Standard.  It has ProBucker-2 and ProBucker-3 pickups with coil-tapping, which distinguishes it from the regular Standard PlusTop. PAF humbuckers were the original humbuckers from 1957. Like the Standard PlusTop, this guitar features a flame maple veneer top.  There are multiple available color finishes including Honeyburst (inspired by late '50s vintage Les Pauls), Heritage Cherry Sunburst, Trans Blue, Vintage Sunburst and Wine Red. The body is nato (with the maple veneer top), the neck is hand-set nato, with a rosewood fingerboard. The scale is 24.75". 

The Les Paul Standard Quilt Top PRO is identical but has a quilted top maple veneer finish and is only available in Trans Blue and Faded Cherry Sunburst colors.

Les Paul Custom

The Les Paul Custom features multiple bindings around the back and top of the body and has a bound headstock with a split-diamond inlay. Unlike the Epiphone Les Paul Standard, the Custom model features a nato back and top, the available color variants were alpine white, black beauty and vintage sunburst just to name a few. The split-diamond inlay on the headstock and the block inlays on the fretboard are slightly smaller than on the comparable Gibson model.

Epiphone discontinued the Les Paul Custom Plus line, which was a normal Les Paul Custom but with a flame maple top and either a Vintage Sunburst or a Cherry Sunburst finish. The "Inspired By Gibson" version features an ebony fretboard and CTS electronics. This makes it more in line with the Gibson variant. The guitar has been known as a favorite of many live players, including Christian Kastoun, among others.

Les Paul Custom 3 Plus
This model was one of the Limited Edition releases in 2006. Each month a new model was issued. It is all black and has the Split Diamond inlay on the headstock. It has 3 uncovered black humbuckers, black Tune-o-Matic bridge and Stop-bar tailpiece. The pickup selector switch is black and the 4 tone / volume knobs are black with white numerals. The binding is off-white.  It has a "trans-flame" Maple veneer top. It has black Grover tuners and white block inlay fret markers.

Les Paul Black Beauty 3
The Epiphone Les Paul Black Beauty 3 is a copy of the Gibson Les Paul Custom with 3 humbucker pickups, in black finish with gold hardware. It is sometimes known as "the tuxedo guitar". Epiphone manufactures 2 variations, one with a traditional Tune-o-matic bridge and one with a Bigsby B6 vibrato unit.

Les Paul ES
The Les Paul ES is very similar in appearance to a normal Les Paul Standard, although it has F-holes in the top. It is actually a semi-hollow bodied guitar, incorporating a solid maple centerblock to combine the small body and 'crunch' of a Les Paul with the warmth of a hollow bodied guitar. "ES" stands for Electric Spanish. The term 'ES' is used by Gibson to signify hollow and semi-hollow bodied guitars, for example Gibson ES-335, so it is quite appropriate for this design. It also comes as a Les Paul ES Custom. The Epiphone versions are quite rare, with only 47 currently known to exist. One can value up to $10,000. Gibson still manufactures and sells an ES version of their Les Paul.

Goth Les Paul Studio
This model is part of the Epiphone Goth series, which are a run of guitars unique to Epiphone. This guitar comes in a satin black finish, and is a mid-range model because of its included pick guard and set-in neck. Its neck is made of nato with a rosewood fretboard consisting of 22 frets and a "XII" inlay at the 12th fret. The body is also nato with 2 Alnico classic humbuckers, a tune-o-matic bridge, and black chrome hardware.

Les Paul Studio
Same as the Epiphone LP Standard, but with open 498 alnico pickups instead of covered, dot fret markers instead of block inlays, and the body is not bound. This model is the same as the "Goth", but there is no XII fret marker, and is available in Ebony, Alpine White, Worn Brown, and Worn Cherry colors.

Les Paul-100

The Les Paul 100 has a bolt-on neck rather than the typical Les Paul set-neck and it also has a nato body thinner than most Les Pauls (the "top" being carved into a standard thickness body blank, as with the early '90s Gibson "The Paul II"). It comes with 2 open-coil humbucker pickups (700T/650R), The Les Paul 100 is cut to the same specs as Les' 1952 original, nato neck, rosewood fretboard (with dot inlays) and a tune-o-matic bridge. It also lacks the Grover Machine Heads in recent production. The Epiphone LP100 does not have binding.

Les Paul Special II

The Les Paul Special II is manufactured by Epiphone with a retail price starting at under US$300. It does not have Alnico classic humbucking pickups, but instead has ceramic Neck Pickup Epiphone 650R Humbucker, Bridge Pickup Epiphone 700T Humbucker, one master volume knob, one tone knob, a three-way pickup selector switch and a rosewood fretboard (with plastic dot inlays). A Tune-O-Matic bridge and stop-bar tailpiece come standard. It is usually constructed of a hardwood body (variants include maple/poplar ply, agathis, okoume, basswood or mahogany plywood) and a bolt-on mahogany, okoume, or nato neck. It is most commonly finished in black, white, red, cherry sunburst and vintage sunburst colors. Company marketing literature occasionally refers to this model as Epiphone's most popular Les Paul model, in part because of both their classic design, as well as their overall simplicity. Although the design has gone largely unchanged over the years, Special IIs have been manufactured in different locations, including China most recently.  Unlike some older models, current Special IIs (which are priced slightly cheaper than in years past), do not bear a "Gibson" labeled truss cover, nor does name appear anywhere on the headstock. Instead the truss cover reads "Special II" in bright lettering. Special IIs comes standard with either nickel-plated chrome or black hardware.

Les Paul Ultra series

The Les Paul Ultra has a nato body, and rosewood fretboard with large mother-of-pearl inlays, the Ultra's body has been hollowed out to create resonation chambers, producing a deep and rich sound, and also reducing the weight of the often heavy Les Paul body. This model also has an ergonomic notch like a Stratocaster to feel comfortable against the player's body. Finish choice is limited to faded Cherry Burst with a quilted maple top. Alnico Classic Humbuckers, Grover Machine Heads and a Tune-o-matic bridge are standard features. The Ultra is now discontinued.

Based on the Ultra, the Les Paul Ultra II has several unique features, including a Chambered Nato body, a NanoMag low impedance pickup, a stereo, mono and USB output and other electronic changes to produce a unique sound. Available finishes for the Ultra II are traditional Faded Cherry Burst, Vintage Sunburst, Midnight Sapphire and Midnight Ebony.

Tribute Les Paul Standard

To celebrate the life of the late Les Paul, Epiphone released a 2010 series of premium Les Paul guitars in which were made available in Heritage Cherry Sunburst and Trans Black The Tribute Les Paul standard has notable inclusions over the standard including maple capped solid mahogany body, Grover Locking Tuners, Mallory 150 Electronics, Gibson Classic '57 and Classic '57 Plus Pickups. There are two versions known as the 1960 and the 2010. The 1960 version has a 1960s style slim taper neck, whereas the 2010 version has an asymmetrical neck.

1959 Les Paul Standard (Limited Edition)

Released in 2009, again, a Les Paul that comes very close to Gibson territory with specs that are very similar to that of the 1960/2010 tribute guitar, with the exception of the following differences:

 BurstBucker and Burstbucker Pro Pickups
 No coil tapping, and therefore tophat dials for volume and tone
 Comes in two colours, iced tea burst and heritage cherry sunburst

The 1959 Les Paul Standard also comes with a certificate of authenticity.

Signature models

Les Paul Tommy Thayer Spaceman Signature
This guitar has a solid nato body and a plain maple veneer top. It has Gibson 498T Humbuckers, Grover tuners, and came with a silver hard case with a certificate of authenticity.
It was modeled on the guitar Tommy Thayer used with Kiss.  Retailed at around $600.  Released on January 1, 2013, with a limited run of 1,000.

Ace Frehley Signature Les Paul
The Ace Frehley Signature model Les Paul Custom made by Epiphone; from 1997 to 2008 was based on the Gibson version. This guitar came with 3 Dimarzio super distortion (DP100) Humbucker Pickups, lightning bolts fingerboard inlays, with Ace's signature inlay at the 12th fret. (Although some models had 2 small lightning bolt inlays at the 12th fret in place of Ace's signature) The headstock was adorned with Ace's "Solo Album" face and a signature on the truss rod cover. Some say the body was multi-bound premium and others say the binding was "painted on" The body was nato with a Flame Maple top, rosewood fingerboard, maple neck and quality chrome-plated hardware. One oddity was that some models came with generic chrome "Tulip" style tuners and some came with Grover "Kidney Bean" style tuners. There were 3 color options: cherry sunburst, translucent black and blue-silver burst. However, the blue-silver burst was made only for the Japanese market and never released in the US.

Zakk Wylde Bullseye Signature Les Paul
Is a signature model made of guitarist Zakk Wylde (Ozzy Osbourne and Black Label Society) made by Epiphone. It comes with the signature "Bullseye" finish, an unfinished maple set neck with a rosewood fretboard, 2 EMG, Inc. passive pickups and gold hardware. There are "Camo" and "Buzzsaw" signature models too, but these have been discontinued.

In 2011, the Epiphone Zakk Wylde Les Paul Custom 'Plus' was introduced which included EMG 81 and 85 active pickups and ebony fretboard.

Slash Signature Les Paul
Signature models of guitarist Slash (Guns N' Roses and ex Velvet Revolver) made by Epiphone. The majority of these models were made in the year of 2008. There is a "Slash's Snakepit Les Paul Classic", which carries his logo, and was developed and released in 1997. There is a "Slash Les Paul Goldtop" that comes with 2 Seymour Duncan Alnico Pro-II pickups, a nato set-neck with a rosewood fretboard, a Tune-o-matic bridge, a maple top, nickel hardware and a metallic gold finish. This model was released in 2008. There is a "Slash Les Paul Standard Plus-Top" model that is very similar to his signature gold top model but this comes with a flame maple top and a tobacco sunburst finish.

References

External links

 

Les Paul